Japan competed at the 2007 Asian Indoor Games held in Macau, China from 26 October to 3 November 2007. Japan finished seventh with 8 gold medals, 7 silver medals, and 11 bronze medals.

Medal summary

Medal table

Medalists

References 

Asian Indoor Games
Japan
2007